Désertines may refer to the following places in France:

 Désertines, Allier, a commune in the department of Allier
 Désertines, Mayenne, a commune in the department of Mayenne